The 2022 Recopa Gaúcha was 9th season of an annual football match contested by the winners of the Campeonato Gaúcho and the Copa FGF in the previous season. The competition is considered a Super Cup of football in Rio Grande do Sul, being organized by FGF. 

The current holders are Grêmio, and they will be able to defend his title by winning the 2021 Campeonato Gaúcho. The opponent will be Glória, who was champion of the 2021 Copa FGF.

Teams

Notes

References

Football competitions in Rio Grande do Sul
2022 in Brazilian football
Recopa Gaúcha
Grêmio Foot-Ball Porto Alegrense matches